Abdulaziz Fahad Al-Masaeed (1915 –  July 9, 2001) was a Kuwaiti journalist, businessman, and member of parliament. He founded Kuwait's first newspaper, Alrai Alaam, in 1961.

Background 
Abdulaziz Al-Masaeed was born in 1915 in the Sheikhdom of Kuwait, and was a member of parliament from 1967 to 1971. He contested the 1981 parliamentary elections but lost. He contested the 1990 Kuwaiti National Council election and was elected its chairman.

Journalistic activity 
In April 1961, Al-Masaeed launched Al Rai Alaam, the first newspaper in Kuwait. Al Masaeed was both the owner and the publisher of the newspaper that was initially published in Beirut, Lebanon. In 1965, he founded the weekly magazine Al-Seyassah with Kuwaiti journalist Ahmed Al-Jarallah as its editor-in-chief. He was a founding member of the Kuwait journalists association and called the dean of the Kuwaiti press. He was Editor-in-Chief of the English newspaper “The Daily News” in 1964.

References 

Members of the National Assembly (Kuwait)
Kuwaiti journalists
Kuwaiti editors
Newspaper publishers (people)
1915 births
2001 deaths